Iván Valencia (born 23 January 1999) is a Mexican footballer who plays as a midfielder for the California United Strikers FC in the National Independent Soccer Association.

Career
After playing with the San Jose Earthquakes academy since 2015, Valencia signed his first professional contract with USL Championship side Reno 1868 on 21 May 2018. Valencia was released by Reno at the end of the season, but continued to train with the club. He re-signed for Reno on 14 September 2019.

He made his professional debut on 15 September 2019, appearing as an 80th-minute substitute in a 2–1 win over Austin Bold.

Reno folded their team on November 6, 2020, due to the financial impact of the COVID-19 pandemic.

Ahead of the 2022 NISA season, Valencia signed with California United Strikers.

References

External links
USL bio

1999 births
Living people
Mexican footballers
Soccer players from California
Association football midfielders
Reno 1868 FC players
USL Championship players
California United Strikers FC players
National Independent Soccer Association players